Lepidiolamprologus hecqui is a species of shell-living cichlid endemic to Lake Tanganyika. This species can reach a length of  TL.  This species can also be found in the aquarium trade.

Etymology
The specific name of this fish honours the Belgian soldier and anti-slave trade campaigner Lieutenant Célestin Hecq (1859-1910) who collected a specimen of the catfish Auchenoglanis scutatus in the mouth of which the type of this species was discovered.

References

hecqui
Taxa named by George Albert Boulenger
Fish described in 1899
Taxonomy articles created by Polbot
Taxobox binomials not recognized by IUCN